Northumberland County Cricket Club played 18 List A cricket matches between 1971 and 2005. This is a list of the players who appeared in those matches that were played. A further List A match was abandoned without a ball being bowled.

Timothy Adcock, 1 match, 1994 
Michael Anderson, 1 match, 1984 
Graeme Angus, 7 matches, 1994–2002
Peter Atkinson, 1 match, 1971 
Jonathon Benn, 1 match, 1992 
David Borthwick, 1 match, 1994 
Alan Brown, 3 matches, 1971–1977
Alexander Brown, 1 match, 2003 
Paul Burn, 1 match, 1992 
Ian Callen, 2 matches, 1977 
Steven Chapman, 4 matches, 2001–2003
Ian Conn, 2 matches, 1992–1994
Kevin Corby, 4 matches, 1984–1989
Paul Cormack, 3 matches, 1986–1989
Mike Crawhall, 3 matches, 1971–1977
Lee Crozier, 8 matches, 1999–2005
Adrian Dalby, 1 match, 1989 
Richard Dreyer, 2 matches, 1986–1987
Paul Dutton, 4 matches, 1987–1994
Wayne Falla, 5 matches, 1992–2000
Stephen Foster, 3 matches, 2000 
Stu Gillespie, 1 match, 1987 
John Graham, 4 matches, 2001–2005
Norman Graham, 1 match, 1984 
Peter Graham, 5 matches, 1986–1994
Stephen Greensword, 3 matches, 1977–1992
Graeme Hallam, 6 matches, 1999–2003
Gordon Halliday, 2 matches, 1984–1986
Adam Heather, 5 matches, 1999–2005
Harry Henderson, 1 match, 1971 
Christopher Hewison, 2 matches, 2002–2003
Stephen Humble, 1 match, 2005 
Peter Ingham, 1 match, 1984 
Alec Johnson, 3 matches, 1971–1977
Peter Kippax, 2 matches, 1977 
Mike Latham, 1 match, 1971 
Stephen Lishman, 1 match, 1984 
James Miller, 1 match, 2001 
Graeme Morris, 3 matches, 1986–1994
Shahid Nazir, 3 matches, 2002–2003
Philip Nicholson, 8 matches, 1999–2005
Ken Norton, 3 matches, 1971–1977
Simon O'Donnell, 1 match, 1989 
Chris Old, 2 matches, 1986–1987
Bradley Parker, 7 matches, 2000–2005
Kenneth Pearson, 6 matches, 1977–1989
Paul Pickworth, 1 match, 1984 
Martin Pollard, 3 matches, 2001–2005
Ian Pont, 1 match, 1989 
Iain Purdy, 1 match, 2003 
Jim Purvis, 2 matches, 1987–1989
Wayne Ritzema, 1 match, 2003 
William Robson, 2 matches, 1977 
David  Rutherford, 7 matches, 1999–2003
Paul Scott, 2 matches, 1986–1987
Rick Sellers, 1 match, 2001 
Imran Shah, 2 matches, 1999–2003
Daniel Shurben, 1 match, 2005 
Martin Speight, 2 matches, 2002–2003
Craig Stanley, 3 matches, 1994–2000
Barry Stewart, 1 match, 2000 
Tim Stonock, 1 match, 2003 
Raymond Swann, 1 match, 1971 
Marc Symington, 2 matches, 2003–2005
Joe Thewlis, 2 matches, 1971–1977
Michael Thewlis, 1 match, 1994 
Matthew Thompson, 1 match, 1999 
Stuart Tiffin, 2 matches, 1989–1992
Henry Twizell, 1 match, 1984 
Jack van Geloven, 1 match, 1971 
Peter Willey, 1 match, 1992 
Kelvin Williams, 3 matches, 1984–1992
John Windows, 9 matches, 1999–2005
John Woodford, 1 match, 1977 
Allan Worthy, 1 match, 2005 
Michael Youll, 3 matches, 1971–1977
Oliver Youll, 2 matches, 1994–1999
Mike Younger, 5 matches, 1984–1994

References

Northumberland County Cricket Club
Northumberland